Dick Wilmarth (c.1942 – March 21, 2018) was a miner and trapper from Red Devil, Alaska who won the inaugural Iditarod Trail Sled Dog Race in 1973 with lead dog Hotfoot.

In a 2001 interview with the Anchorage Daily News, Wilmarth said he saw the 1973 Iditarod as not really a sled dog race but more of a time to enjoy the Alaska wilderness with friends. He assembled a 12-dog team just a few months before the race, obtaining dogs from Native villages on the Kuskokwim River.

Thirty-five dog teams started the 1973 race and twenty-two finished. Competing in what would be his only Iditarod, Wilmarth won in a time of in 20 days, 49 minutes, 41 seconds, claiming the first-place prize money of $12,000. Almost two weeks behind him was John Schultz who became the recipient of the first ever "Red Lantern" award given to the last musher to cross the finish line in Nome, Alaska.

References

Sources
 Anchorage Daily News story
 "Iditarod Glory" by Brian Patrick O'Donoghue and Jeff Schultz. (2006) Graphic Arts Center Publishing Co. 

1942 births
2018 deaths
Dog mushers from Alaska
Iditarod champions
People from Bethel Census Area, Alaska